The Insulated World is the tenth studio album by Japanese heavy metal band Dir En Grey, released on September 26, 2018 via Firewall Div./SMEJ.

Release 

The Insulated World is the first album in 4 years since Arche. Remixed and remastered version of two pre-release singles "Utafumi" and "Ningen o Kaburu" (with re-recorded vocals) are included exclusively for this release.

The Insulated World is available in three editions: regular edition, first press limited edition with a bonus CD and limited deluxe edition with a bonus CD as well as a bonus Blu-ray/DVD. The bonus CD in limited deluxe edition included new version of three old songs including "Kigan" (from Kisō), "The Deeper Vileness" (from The Marrow of a Bone) and "Wake" (from Macabre) as well as live recordings of "Fukai" "Ash" and "Beautiful Dirt", taken from performance at Shinkiba Studio Coast in Kōtō, Tokyo, Japan on June 30, 2018. The bonus CD in first press limited edition only included "Kigan" as well as live recordings of "Fukai" and "Beautiful Dirt".

The bonus Blu-ray/DVD included live recordings taken from performances at Sendai Ginko Hall Izumity21 in Sendai, Miyagi Prefecture, Japan on April 28, 2018 and Shinkiba Studio Coast in Kōtō, Tokyo, Japan on April 30, 2018 (additional show), respectively.

Track listing

Personnel

Dir En Grey
  – lead vocals
  – guitars, programming
 Die – guitars
 Toshiya – bass
 Shinya – drums

Additional musician
 Kazutaka Minemori – Master Tone

Production
 Dir En Grey – production
 Keisuke Kamata – recording
 Koji Maruyama – recording
 Ryosuke Ishida – engineering assistant
 Takashi Nemoto – engineering assistant
 Dan Lancaster – mixing
 Brian "Big Bass" Gardner – mastering
 Koji Yoda – cover art, art direction, design
 Rino Chihara – design
 Takao Ogata – photography
 Dynamite Tommy – executive producer

Production 
 Koji Maruyama – mixing
 Jens Bogren – mixing

Charts

References

2018 albums
Dir En Grey albums
Japanese-language albums